Sarajuy-ye Shomali Rural District is in the Central District of Maragheh County, East Azerbaijan province, Iran. At the National Census of 2006, its population was 22,664 in 5,196 households. There were 24,479 inhabitants in 6,805 households at the following census of 2011. At the most recent census of 2016, the population of the rural district was 25,650 in 7,548 households. The largest of its 34 villages was Karajabad, with 2,325 people.

References 

Maragheh County

Rural Districts of East Azerbaijan Province

Populated places in East Azerbaijan Province

Populated places in Maragheh County